Hasan Vanlıoğlu (born 25 August 1988) is a Turkish judoka.

He is the silver medallist of the 2017 Judo Grand Prix Antalya in the -73 kg category.

References

External links

 

1988 births
Living people
Turkish male judoka
Mediterranean Games gold medalists for Turkey
Mediterranean Games medalists in judo
Competitors at the 2013 Mediterranean Games
European Games competitors for Turkey
Judoka at the 2015 European Games
21st-century Turkish people